This Is Who I Am is the debut studio album of the Russian singer-songwriter, Lena Katina, released on 18 November 2014. The album marks the beginning of Katina's solo career as she and her former bandmate, Julia Volkova announced the separation of their music group, t.A.T.u. on 2011. Katina has writing credits on all of the album's songs including those co-written with her husband, Sash Kuzma. Musically, the album is a pop genre with rock influences and lyrically it mostly speaks about discovering herself.

Four singles were released from the album, and her first and lead single of the album "Never Forget" reached No. 1 on the MTV Russia Top 10 and also won the said station - 2011 Video of The Year. The remix track of "Never Forget" by Dave Audé also reached No. 1 on the US Billboard Hot Dance Club Play and reached No. 1 in Greece. "Lift Me Up" released as the second single and the track has a positive feedback from Spanish audiences. The third and fourth singles, "Who I Am" and "An Invitation", have been successful in several Europe countries such as Germany, Italy, Spain and her homeland, Russia.

This Is Who I Am received both positive and negative reviews from critics. The album was released worldwide as a digital download and the physical copy of the CD was released on Katina's official website.

Background and development 
When Katina announced the separation of t.A.T.u., she immediately left Russia and went to  the United States to find a label and start her solo career. However, several label groups rejected her and Katina said in an interview, "I am trying to find a label, but they don't want me, for some reason..." Despite this, the singer still pursued her own career through funding it with her own money and was supported by former t.A.T.u.'s executive producer, Boris Renski.

Katina spent a few years in Los Angeles, California recording and writing her first solo album with her band members, Sven Martin, Domen Vajevec, Steve Wilson and Jörg Kohring. It took almost five years to finish the entire album and Katina said in an interview, "It is a good result of a hard work and a long path of becoming a solo singer and a songwriter, of finding myself... I am so happy that my fans are still waiting and I finally have a chance to share my emotions with them through my songs"

This Is Who I Am was released with 13 tracks. Katina was highly involved with the packaging, designing the album with several photos of her with friends, parents and Julia Volkova with her personal handwriting as the caption.

On 15 December 2014, the album was released in Italy with 14 tracks. The Italian edition of the album featured the song "Golden Leaves" with the collaboration of Italian singer, Noemi Smorra.

On 1 July 2016, the album was re-released under the Spanish title, "Esta Soy Yo". The reissued album contains the Spanish translated tracks with three remixes such as "Levántame (Dave Audé Radio Remix)", "No Voy A Olvidarte (Maragakis Remix)" and "Perdida En El Baile (Fly_Dream Remix)" Spanish translated lyrics were done by her friend, Karina Nuvo. On the same date of re-release, Katina announced that she and her team are working for the Russian version of the album.

Critical reception 
This Is Who I Am received both positive and negative reviews from critics and fans. "For  highs, the album does have a few lows...", the Pop Sun said, adding, "with  bad, I would still rate this album pretty favorably because of the highs. It’s definitely an album people should listen to, even if you’re not familiar with Lena Katina."

Track listing 
Official track listing

Personnel 
 Lena Katina - lead vocals, background vocals, executive producer, writer
 Sven Martin - executive producer, guitars, writer, keyboard, programming
 Jasmine Ash - writer, backing vocals
 Erik Lewander - writer, producer, keyboards, programming
 Iggy Strange Dahl - writer
 Jacques Brautbar - writer. keyboards, guitars, bass, programming
 VASSY - writer
 Erik Lidbom - writer, producer
 Justin Gray - writer, sound mixer, producer, backing vocals, keyboards, programming, guitars, drums, bass
 Boris Renski - producer, writer, recording
 Domen Vajevec - guitars, writer, producer, bass, keyboards, programming
 Jorg Kohring - drums, writer, guitars, backing vocals
 Sash Kuzma - drums, writer, recording, producer, keyboards, programming
 Steve Wilson - bass, drums, writer
 Andre Recke - management
 Dean Beckett - product manager
 Greg Benninger - graphic designer
 Maria Abraham - writer
 Steven Lee - writer, producer, keyboards, programming
 Sammy Naja - writer, producer, keyboards, programming
 Drew Ryan Scott - writer, producer
 Troy MacCubbin - writer, guitars
 Lene Dissing - writer
 Hayden Bell - writer
 Sarah Lundbank - writer
 Veronica Ferraro - sound mixer
 Mike Boden - sound mixer
 Joe Zook - sound mixer
 Ken Lewis - sound mixer
 Nathanael Boone - sound mixer
 Matt Marrin - sound mixer
 Alan Johannes - guitars
 Jeanette Olson - backing vocals
 Nadia Duggin - backing vocals
 Nicole Kehl - backing vocals
 Pelle Hillstrom - guitars
 Fox Fagan - bass
 Bruno Gruel - sound engineer

Release history

References 

2014 debut albums
Lena Katina albums